Frans Petit (15 November 1898 – 20 February 1971) was a Dutch footballer. He played in one match for the Netherlands national football team in 1922.

References

External links
 

1898 births
1971 deaths
Dutch footballers
Netherlands international footballers
Place of birth missing
Association footballers not categorized by position